Neranjana Wanniarachchi (born 9 June 1998) is a Sri Lankan cricketer. He made his first-class debut for Burgher Recreation Club in the 2016–17 Premier League Tournament on 9 December 2016.

References

External links
 

1998 births
Living people
Sri Lankan cricketers
Burgher Recreation Club cricketers
Kandy Customs Sports Club cricketers
Cricketers from Colombo